Natovi Landing is a ferry port in Tailevu Province, Fiji, linking cargo trucks to the three big islands of Fiji. Nearby Korovou is the closest drop off for travelers trekking with local busses, the post is mainly service by Patterson Brothers Shipping Company LTD.

Transport in Fiji
Tailevu Province